The 2021 Women's NORCECA Volleyball Championship was the 27th edition of the tournament, and was played from 26 August to 31 August 2021 in Guadalajara, Mexico. The champion and first runner-ups will qualify for the 2022 FIVB Volleyball Women's World Championship.

Competing nations
The following national teams have qualified:

Squads

Pool standing procedure
 Number of matches won
 Match points
 Points ratio
 Sets ratio
 Result of the last match between the tied teams

Match won 3–0: 5 match points for the winner, 0 match points for the loser
Match won 3–1: 4 match points for the winner, 1 match point for the loser
Match won 3–2: 3 match points for the winner, 2 match points for the loser

Preliminary round

Pool A

Pool B

Final round

Quarterfinals

Fifth place match

Semifinals

3rd place match

Final

Final standing

Awards

Most Valuable Player

Best Scorer

Best Server

Best Digger

Best Receiver

Best Setter

Best Outside Spikers

Best Middle Blockers

Best Opposite Spiker

Best Libero

See also
2021 Men's NORCECA Volleyball Championship

References

External links
Official website

Women's NORCECA Volleyball Championship
NORCECA
International volleyball competitions hosted by Mexico
2021 in Mexican sports
NORCECA
Sport in Guadalajara, Jalisco